The Nini-Suhien National Park is found in Ghana. It was established in 1976.

Along with the Ankasa Resource Reserve, the national park is part of the  Ankasa Conservation Area.

References

National parks of Ghana
Eastern Guinean forests
Protected areas established in 1976
1976 establishments in Ghana